Damon Lamon Stoudamire (born September 3, 1973) is an American college basketball coach and former player who is currently the head coach for the Georgia Tech Yellow Jackets of the Atlantic Coast Conference (ACC). The ,  point guard was selected with the 7th overall pick by the Toronto Raptors in the 1995 NBA draft and won the 1995–96 NBA Rookie of the Year Award. He played collegiately at the University of Arizona, and professionally for the Toronto Raptors, Portland Trail Blazers, Memphis Grizzlies and San Antonio Spurs.

Early life
Stoudamire was born to Willie Stoudamire and Liz Washington in Portland, Oregon; he was the only child, with three stepsisters; his parents never married. Willie Stoudamire moved away to Milwaukee, Wisconsin, to work in a brewery when Damon was seven years old. Stoudamire was raised by his mother, Liz, and his grandmother, Wanda Stoudamire-Matthews.

While Stoudamire was growing up, his uncles, Charles and Anthony Stoudamire, got him involved in sports, mainly basketball and football. They acted as fathers and personal coaches to Stoudamire in his younger years, as he grew up watching his favorite player, Nate Archibald, and attempted to pattern his game after his childhood hero. As he grew older, Stoudamire began to play basketball at Irving Park in the Portland–Irvington neighborhood and at the Matt Dishman Community Center in Portland.

Stoudamire attended Holy Redeemer grade school (a Catholic school) and Harriet Tubman Middle School, then attended Woodrow Wilson High School. During his junior year in high school, his grandmother Wanda died of cancer. He would later tattoo Wanda's face and her address on his left arm in remembrance. He was expected to attend and play basketball at Oregon, but chose to attend Arizona instead.

High school career
Stoudamire attended Wilson High School, now Ida B. Wells-Barnett High School, playing there for the Trojans, where he led his team to a 74–4 record and state championships in 1989 and 1991. He averaged 26.1 points, 9.2 assists, and 3.6 rebounds per game while playing for his school. He earned two Oregon Player of the Year and one Converse High School All-American awards during his senior year.

College career
Stoudamire played point guard for the Arizona Wildcats and coach, Lute Olson. He was a first-team All-American and finalist for College Player of the Year. He teamed with Khalid Reeves his junior year to lead the team to the Final Four. During his senior year he earned the All-American honors for his 22.8 points per game. He also finished his college career first on the Wildcats' all-time list in three-pointers made (272), second in points (1,849), fourth in assists (663), and was the only player in Arizona history to have two 40-point games. Stoudamire scored his career-high 45 points at Stanford University on January 14, 1995. He was named a 1995 Wooden Award finalist after sharing the Pac-10 Player of the Year award with Ed O'Bannon.

Despite being the youngest player on the roster of the United States men's national basketball team, Stoudamire led the team in assists and steals en route to a gold medal at the 1993 Summer Universiade.

Professional career

Toronto Raptors (1995–1998) 
Stoudamire made an impact with the Raptors before he ever set foot on the court for them. At the 1995 NBA Draft held in Toronto, the fans in attendance chanted loudly for the Raptors to select UCLA standout Ed O'Bannon with their first ever draft pick, loudly booing when the team announced their first pick would be Stoudamire instead. Years later, Stoudamire would tell Maclean's that the boos did not bother him, being extra motivation for him, with the fans turning around on him once they saw him play for the first time. Stoudamire would go on to a noteworthy rookie season with the Raptors, averaging 9.3 assists and 19 points per game. He earned the nickname "Mighty Mouse" because he stands only , and because he had a Mighty Mouse tattoo on his right arm going into his rookie season. He set the record for three-point field goals made by a rookie with 133 breaking the record at the time held by Dennis Scott. This record has been broken several times over since Stoudamire's 133 mark. It is currently held by Donovan Mitchell, who made 187 threes in his rookie season. Stoudamire is third in assist average by a rookie. He ranked second in scoring among all rookies in 1995–96, and led all rookies in minutes played and assists. He received the Schick Rookie of the Month award twice and unanimously made the Schick All Rookie First Team, and eventually won the Rookie of the Year award, receiving 76 of the possible 113 votes, and the MVP award of the Rookie All-Star Game. He holds the record for being the third-lowest draft pick (7th overall) to ever win the Rookie of the Year award, with the lowest being Malcolm Brogdon (36th in the second round.) He is also known as the shortest player to ever win this award. He did not play the last 10 games of his rookie season due to tendinitis in his left knee. The Raptors finished that year and his rookie season with 21 wins and 61 losses.

Stoudamire previously held the record for most triple doubles with the Toronto Raptors with 3 triple doubles, a record that stood until 2014, when it was broken by Kyle Lowry.

Portland Trail Blazers (1998–2005) 
On February 13, 1998, he was traded by the Raptors along with Walt Williams and Carlos Rogers to the Portland Trail Blazers in exchange for Kenny Anderson, Alvin Williams, Gary Trent, two first-round draft picks, a second-round draft pick and cash considerations. During the first round of the 1998 NBA Playoffs, on April 26, 1998, Stoudamire scored 17 points and recorded 14 assists during a Game 2 loss to the Los Angeles Lakers. On December 28, 2000, Stoudamire scored 32 points and hit the game-winning shot with 0.4 seconds left during a 103–102 win over the Utah Jazz. In the 2002–03 season, the Blazers benched Stoudamire for most of the season. The new head coach, Maurice Cheeks, went with Scottie Pippen and Bonzi Wells instead at the guard positions. However, Stoudamire received significant playing time in the playoffs that season.

On January 14, 2005, Stoudamire hit a career-high and Blazers then-franchise record 54 points, which included 8 3-pointers, against the New Orleans Hornets. The same season, on April 15, he shot an NBA record 21 3-point attempts, making only 5 of them.

Stoudamire's contract with the Blazers expired at the end of the 2004–05 season, and it became widely known that the Blazers, who were focusing on youth movement and looking for players with good character, had no intention of re-signing him. This became abundantly clear in August 2005, when the team signed free agent guard Juan Dixon to a contract, and assigned him Stoudamire's uniform number (3). Stoudamire wanted the Blazers to work out a sign-and-trade deal whereby he would end up with the Houston Rockets, but since this would have required Portland to take one of Houston's overpaid players in return and the team, at that time, had a relatively high payroll, Portland management decided to go in another direction with players like Travis Outlaw and Sebastian Telfair.

Memphis Grizzlies (2005–2008) 
On August 5, 2005, after Stoudamire had been in discussions with several teams, it was announced he signed a 4-year deal with the Memphis Grizzlies, where he replaced Jason Williams, who left for the Miami Heat, as the starting point guard. On December 30, 2005, he tore his right patellar tendon, coincidentally in his hometown of Portland. He was carted off the court, and had successful surgery in Birmingham, Alabama the following week. He missed the rest of the 2005–06 season, returning for 2006–07, and ended up playing 62 games, of which he started 51 (evenly splitting point guard duties with veteran backup Chucky Atkins).

During the 2007–08 season, on NBA Access with Ahmad Rashad, he said that he was working hard with Mike Conley, Jr., a 2007 draft pick by the Grizzlies, who, after Stoudamire had left, would play a major role as a point guard. When Conley returned from an injury, Grizzlies head coach Marc Iavaroni placed Stoudamire on the inactive list and used inexperienced rookie Mike Conley Jr. as the starting point guard, causing Stoudamire to look for a trade or a buyout. On January 26, 2008, the Grizzlies reached a tentative contractual buyout agreement with Stoudamire, with the San Antonio Spurs, Boston Celtics, Phoenix Suns, Denver Nuggets and Toronto Raptors registering strong interest in signing him. On January 28, the buyout was completed and Stoudamire was placed on waivers. The Celtics initially showed strong interest in Stoudamire but since set their sights on the LA Clippers' Sam Cassell. According to Stoudamire's agent, Stoudamire was to sign with the Spurs.

San Antonio Spurs (2008)
On February 3, 2008, Stoudamire signed a contract with the San Antonio Spurs. He briefly started for the Spurs while Tony Parker was injured, but then was relegated to spot duty throughout the rest of the season and the playoffs.

Stoudamire considered going to camp with the Houston Rockets, but he did not attend training camp.

Coaching

Rice Owls men's basketball team (2008–2009) 
In December 2008, Stoudamire accepted a coaching position as director of player development for the guard-heavy Rice University Owls squad under head coach Ben Braun.

Memphis Grizzlies (2009–2011) 
In February 2009, Stoudamire joined the coaching staff of the Grizzlies, along with Henry Bibby.

Return to College (2011–2021) 
In May 2011, Stoudamire joined the coaching staff of the University of Memphis Tigers men's basketball team, where his coaching and recruiting contributions were noted with enthusiasm during the '11-'12 season.

In May 2013, Stoudamire left Memphis to join the coaching staff of the Arizona Wildcats men's basketball team.

In May 2015, Stoudamire left Arizona to rejoin the coaching staff of the Memphis Tigers men's basketball team.

In March 2016, Stoudamire left Memphis to take over the head coaching position for the Pacific Tigers men's basketball team.

Before Arizona hired Gonzaga men’s basketball assistant coach Tommy Lloyd to be their next head coach, Stoudamire was considered among the favorites to be the next coach at his alma mater.

Boston Celtics (2021–2023) 
In July 2021, Stoudamire left Pacific to accept an assistant coach position with the Boston Celtics.

Georgia Tech (2023–present) 
On March 13, 2023, Stoudamire was announced as the new head coach of the Georgia Tech Yellow Jackets.

NBA career statistics

Regular season

|-
| align="left" | 
| align="left" | Toronto
| 70 || 70 || 40.9 || .426 || .395 || .797 || 4.0 || 9.3 || 1.4 || .3 || 19.0
|-
| align="left" | 
| align="left" | Toronto
| 81 || 81 || 40.9 || .401 || .355 || .823 || 4.1 || 8.8 || 1.5 || .2 || 20.2
|-
| align="left" | 
| align="left" | Toronto
| 49 || 49 || 41.5 || .425 || .317 || .844 || 4.4 || 8.1 || 1.6 || .1 || 19.4
|-
| align="left" | 
| align="left" | Portland
| 22 || 22 || 36.6 || .364 || .263 || .787 || 3.7 || 8.2 || 1.5 || .1 || 12.4
|-
| align="left" | 
| align="left" | Portland
| 50 || 50 || 33.5 || .396 || .310 || .730 || 3.3 || 6.2 || 1.0 || .1 || 12.6
|-
| align="left" | 
| align="left" | Portland
| 78 || 78 || 30.4 || .432 || .377 || .841 || 3.1 || 5.2 || 1.0 || .0 || 12.5
|-
| align="left" | 
| align="left" | Portland
| 82 || 82 || 32.4 || .434 || .374 || .831 || 3.7 || 5.7 || 1.3 || .1 || 13.0
|-
| align="left" | 
| align="left" | Portland
| 75 || 71 || 37.3 || .402 || .353 || .888 || 3.9 || 6.5 || .9 || .1 || 13.5
|-
| align="left" | 
| align="left" | Portland
| 59 || 27 || 22.3 || .376 || .386 || .791 || 2.6 || 3.5 || .7 || .1 || 6.9
|-
| align="left" | 
| align="left" | Portland
| 82 || 82 || 38.0 || .401 || .365 || .876 || 3.8 || 6.1 || 1.2 || .1 || 13.4
|-
| align="left" | 
| align="left" | Portland
| 81 || 70 || 34.1 || .392 || .369 || .915 || 3.8 || 5.7 || 1.1 || .0 || 15.8
|-
| align="left" | 
| align="left" | Memphis
| 27 || 27 || 31.9 || .397 || .346 || .855 || 3.5 || 4.7 || .7 || .0 || 11.7
|-
| align="left" | 
| align="left" | Memphis
| 62 || 51 || 24.2 || .391 || .337 || .795 || 2.2 || 4.8 || .8 || .0 || 7.5
|-
| align="left" | 
| align="left" | Memphis
| 29 || 29 || 21.5 || .397 || .383 || .808 || 2.4 || 3.9 || .7 || .0 || 7.3
|-
| align="left" | 
| align="left" | San Antonio
| 31 || 4 || 13.3 || .301 || .255 || .750 || 1.5 || 1.7 || .4 || .1 || 3.4
|- class="sortbottom"
| style="text-align:center;" colspan="2"| Career
| 878 || 793 || 33.2 || .406 || .357 || .833 || 3.5 || 6.1 || 1.1 || .1 || 13.4

Playoffs

|-
| align="left" | 1998
| align="left" | Portland
| 4 || 4 || 41.5 || .397 || .364 || 1.000 || 4.3 || 9.5 || 1.3 || .3 || 17.8
|-
| align="left" | 1999
| align="left" | Portland
| 13 || 13 || 31.0 || .380 || .455 || .706 || 3.2 || 5.6 || .6 || .1 || 10.2
|-
| align="left" | 2000
| align="left" | Portland
| 16 || 16 || 27.9 || .415 || .333 || .833 || 2.6 || 3.6 || .5 || .3 || 8.9
|-
| align="left" | 2001
| align="left" | Portland
| 3 || 3 || 38.0 || .413 || .154 || 1.000 || 3.0 || 4.3 || .7 || .3 || 17.7
|-
| align="left" | 2002
| align="left" | Portland
| 3 || 3 || 33.0 || .227 || .750 || .667 || 2.3 || 3.3 || .7 || .0 || 5.0
|-
| align="left" | 2003
| align="left" | Portland
| 7 || 6 || 33.1 || .456 || .484 || .952 || 5.1 || 5.6 || .9 || .3 || 15.3
|-
| align="left" | 2008
| align="left" | San Antonio
| 7 || 0 || 5.0 || .333 || .250 || .667 || 1.0 || .3 || .1 || .0 || 1.9
|- class="sortbottom"
| style="text-align:center;" colspan="2"| Career
| 53 || 45 || 28.2 || .399 || .389 || .847 || 3.0 || 4.4 || .6 || .2 || 10.1

Head coaching record

Personal life
Stoudamire is the cousin of former NBA players Salim Stoudamire and Terrence Jones, and current NBA player Grant Williams.

Marijuana possession
Stoudamire's stint with the Portland Trail Blazers was marred by several marijuana-related incidents, including one during the 2002–03 season where, with then-starting power forward Rasheed Wallace, his yellow Hummer was pulled over on Interstate 5 for speeding and driving under the influence of marijuana. In July 2003, after Stoudamire's third arrest for marijuana possession, he was fined $250,000 and was suspended by the team for three months. Blazers president Steve Patterson announced that he wanted to void Stoudamire's contract, but did not find a provision in the contract that would allow him to do so.

Stoudamire completed a 90-day rehabilitation program. In addition, he made an agreement with The Oregonian sports columnist John Canzano to take an unannounced urine test during any point of the 2003–04 season to prove his sobriety. Midway through the season, Canzano appeared in the team locker room and produced a specimen bottle which Stoudamire filled. An independent testing laboratory reported back the result that he was indeed clean. The incident rehabilitated Stoudamire in the minds of many Portland fans, who had come to regard him as one of the "Jail Blazers". However, Stoudamire was criticized by the National Basketball Players Association for the drug test, which claimed that NBA players may only submit to such tests as prescribed by the NBA Collective Bargaining Agreement. The fact that the test was voluntary, and not administered by the league or any of its teams, did not make Stoudamire immune to such criticism. Despite the criticism, no official action was taken by the union against Stoudamire for his participation in the test.

In an interview on The Post Game Podcast after retiring, Stoudamire voiced his frustration with how the city received the team and the incident, saying he and his teammates "Were just kids" when it happened.

See also
Toronto Raptors accomplishments and records

References

Airborne: The Damon Stoudamire Story by Doug Smith

External links
 

TheDraftReview.com – NBA Draft profile

1973 births
Living people
20th-century African-American sportspeople
21st-century African-American sportspeople
African-American basketball coaches
African-American basketball players
All-American college men's basketball players
American expatriate basketball people in Canada
American men's basketball players
Arizona Wildcats men's basketball coaches
Arizona Wildcats men's basketball players
Basketball coaches from Oregon
Basketball players from Portland, Oregon
Boston Celtics assistant coaches
College men's basketball head coaches in the United States
Competitors at the 1994 Goodwill Games
Georgia Tech Yellow Jackets men's basketball coaches
Goodwill Games medalists in basketball
Ida B. Wells-Barnett High School alumni
Medalists at the 1993 Summer Universiade
Memphis Grizzlies assistant coaches
Memphis Grizzlies players
Memphis Tigers men's basketball coaches
Pacific Tigers men's basketball coaches
Point guards
Portland Trail Blazers players
San Antonio Spurs players
Sportspeople from Portland, Oregon
Toronto Raptors draft picks
Toronto Raptors players
Universiade gold medalists for the United States
Universiade medalists in basketball